Omnipotent Youth Society (OYS), is a Chinese alternative rock band that was formed in the late '90s in Shijiazhuang, Hebei, an industrial city in northern China. Currently it has four members: Dong Yaqian (Er Qian) (lead vocals, guitar), Ji Geng (bass), Yang Yougeng (Xiao Geng) (drums) and Shi Li (trumpet). Most songs were written by Dong Yaqian (music) and Ji Geng (lyrics).

Career

OYS started performing in Shijiazhuang in the late 1990s. The band was first named "The Nico", after the daughter of Shannon Hoon, the late singer of Blind Melon. The name was changed to Omnipotent Youth Society in 2002.

OYS released their first single "Not Omnipotent Comedy" in 2006.

OYS's first album was released in 2010, after the band's name.

On January 12, 2013, Han Han, a famous Chinese writer, advocated for OYS by writing lyrics for the song "Killing the One From Shijiazhuang".

In October 2014, OYS performed in Central Park in New York City in the Modern Sky Festival by the Beijing-based organization Modern Sky.

In October 2015, OYS toured Taiwan.

Musical style and influences

Discography

Studio albums

Singles 
 2006 <不万能的喜剧> (Not Omnipotent Comedy)
 2013 <乌云典当记> (A Tale of the Stormy Pawn Shop)
 2015 <冀西南林路行> (A Walk in the Woods of Southwestern Hebei)

References

External links
Interview: Omnipotent Youth Society Talking to one of China's best bands at home in Shijiazhuang
Chinese New Rock:Omnipotent Youth Society
Omnipotent Youth Society Douban page

Chinese rock music groups
People from Shijiazhuang
Chinese alternative rock groups